Shot welding is a type of spot welding used to join two pieces of metal together. This is accomplished by clamping the two pieces together and then passing a large electric current through them for a short period of time.  Shot welding was invented by Earl J. Ragsdale, a mechanical engineer at the Budd Company, in 1932 to weld stainless steel. This welding method was used to construct the Pioneer Zephyr.

Method
The E. G. Budd Company of Philadelphia recognized the important metallurgical characteristics of 18/8 stainless steel (known today as SAE 304 austenitic stainless steel) and developed a spot welding process to take advantage of the oxidized layer on the surface of stainless steel. Heat treating the 18-8 stainless steel leaves the metal with non-magnetic and ductile properties. Repeatedly reheating the metal to 1000–1100°C impairs the mechanical and chemical properties of the metal. The metal becomes susceptible to corrosion due to carbide precipitation, and loses fatigue resistance.  The important factor in controlling the metal's properties is the dwell time at those temperatures. Using a controlled time element and recorder, a power supply with smooth current, and very brief high currents, a satisfactory spot weld may be produced.

The corona of the shot weld should not exist on the metal, and the equipment used produces satisfactory welds with a smaller than normal diameter. Sufficient electrode force is applied to hold the two sheets of metal together and the peak current rapidly creates a forge weld at the interface between the two sheets, producing a small nugget of weld metal, which when cooled results in a shear-resistant metal interface. Good shotwelds have twice the shear strength of a rivet of similar diameter and can be placed 50% closer together. When done properly, distortion, which is a problem in fusion welding processes, is eliminated.

References
 Ragsdale, Earl J. W., (August 20, 1932), Patent number 1,944,106 - Method and product of electric welding (PDF). Retrieved February 27, 2005.
 Shot Welding - A Forward Step in Resistance Welding, The Welding Engineer, 17 (8), August 1932, p. 25-26.
 Morton C. Walling: Stitching Steel Into Streamliners - Budd’s new assembly line rolls out cars like cans. Popular Science, February 1947, p. 121-127 (archive link).

Welding
Budd Company